Luca Leonardi (born 1 January 1991) is an Italian freestyle swimmer. He won an individual bronze in the 100 m at the 2014 European Aquatics Championships, as well as several medals in the freestyle relays at European championships; in those relays he sometimes swam in the preliminaries, but not in the finals.

Leonardi is an athlete of the Gruppo Sportivo Fiamme Oro.

References

External links
 
 
 
 Luca Leonardi at Azzurra91.it

1991 births
Living people
Italian male freestyle swimmers
European Aquatics Championships medalists in swimming
Swimmers at the 2016 Summer Olympics
Olympic swimmers of Italy
Universiade medalists in swimming
Mediterranean Games gold medalists for Italy
Mediterranean Games medalists in swimming
Swimmers at the 2013 Mediterranean Games
Universiade bronze medalists for Italy
Swimmers of Fiamme Oro
Medalists at the 2011 Summer Universiade